John Ward was an English professional footballer of the 1920s. Born in Birtley, he joined Gillingham from Darlington in 1925 and went on to make two appearances for the club in The Football League. He left to join Fatfield Albion in 1926.

He signed for Bradford City from Fatfield in October 1927. He made 5 league appearances for the club, before being released in June 1928.

Sources

References

English footballers
Gillingham F.C. players
Darlington F.C. players
Year of birth missing
Year of death missing
Bradford City A.F.C. players
English Football League players
Association football goalkeepers
Footballers from Northumberland